Lyell Edward "Bill" Newton (29 July 1935 – 2 August 2015) was an Australian politician. He was a Member of the Queensland Legislative Assembly.

Early life 
Newton was born in Brisbane to Edward Charles Newton and Lily Alice, née Zanow. He attended state school at Morayfield before becoming a fruit farmer and grazier in Rocksberg.

Politics 
Newton was a member of the National Party, and served as Chairman of the Caboolture branch from 1963 to 1983. In that year he was elected to the Queensland Legislative Assembly as the member for Caboolture; at the following election in 1986 he transferred to Glass House, but in 1989 he was defeated.

Later life 
Newton died on 2 August 2015 at Caboolture.

References

1934 births
2015 deaths
National Party of Australia members of the Parliament of Queensland
Members of the Queensland Legislative Assembly